
In molecular biology mir-451 microRNA is a short RNA molecule. MicroRNAs function to regulate the expression levels of other genes by several mechanisms.

miR-451 regulates the drug-transporter protein P-glycoprotein, potentially promoting resistance to the chemotherapy drug Paclitaxel.

Applications
A proof-of-concept experiment has shown that miR-451, as well as mir-126 and mir-150, could be using in forensic science to distinguish between blood and saliva samples. This is made possible by different miRNA profiles of miRNAs in the different tissue types.

References

Further reading

External links
 
 

MicroRNA
Non-coding RNA